Samuel Kenneth Ashford (born 21 December 1995) is an English professional footballer who plays as a centre forward or winger for Scottish Championship club Ayr United.

He played for Tottenham Hotspur's academy before starting his career non-league football with Maldon & Tiptree in 2014. He later played for Heybridge Swifts, Stansted, Witham Town and Brightlingsea Regent before joining National League South side East Thurrock United in 2019. He also played at this level with Concord Rangers and Hemel Hempstead Town before joining EFL League Two club Crawley Town in summer 2020. He had a loan spell at Woking in the National League in 2021 before joining Scottish Championship club Ayr United in January 2022. He is a former England C international.

Early life
Ashford was born in Chelmsford.

Club career
Ashford joined the academy of Tottenham Hotspur at the age of 8 before being released by the club at under-14 level.

After spells with Maldon & Tiptree, Heybridge Swifts and Essex Senior League side Stansted, where he scored 32 goals in 68 appearances, Ashford joined Witham Town in 2017. In November 2017, Ashford joined Brightlingsea Regent, before leaving the club in February 2018, having made only a handful of appearances as a result of injury. He rejoined Witham Town later that year.

In January 2019, Ashford joined National League South side East Thurrock United, before joining fellow National League South side and local rivals Concord Rangers later that year, where he made 8 appearances, scoring 3 goals. While signed to Concord Rangers he returned briefly to Witham Town for the final game of the 2018–19 season, scoring in that game, after Concord failed to make the play-offs. Ashford signed for fellow National League South side Hemel Hempstead Town in the summer of 2019. Ashford scored for Hemel on the opening game of the 2019–20 season in a 4–1 victory over Hungerford Town. He scored 10 goals in 29 league appearances across the 2019–20 season.

Crawley Town
Following the expiry of his contract at Hemel Hempstead Town, Ashford joined League Two side Crawley Town in summer 2020 on a two-year contract. On his debut for the club on 5 September, Ashford scored Crawley's only goal of their 3–1 home defeat to Millwall in the EFL Cup. After 14 appearances for Crawley, Ashford joined Woking on loan until the end of the season on 5 March 2021. He scored his first goal for Woking the following day on his debut, heading in the opening goal of a 3–0 win over King's Lynn Town.

He scored his first league goal for Crawley in a 2–2 draw with Harrogate Town on 21 September 2021. He scored twice in 15 matches for Crawley during the 2021–22 season.

Ayr United
On 29 January 2022, Ashford signed for Scottish Championship club Ayr United on a free transfer. He signed an 18-month contract with the club. He made his debut later that day as a substitute in a 1–1 draw with Hamilton Academical, and scored Ayr's equaliser 7 minutes after coming on as a substitute.

International career
He made two appearances for the England C team in 2018.

Playing style
Ashford plays as a centre forward and winger.

Personal life
His father Mark Ashford is manager of non-league club Witham Town; Sam played under Mark at the club.

Career statistics

References

External links
 
 

1995 births
Living people
English footballers
Stansted F.C. players
Tottenham Hotspur F.C. players
Maldon & Tiptree F.C. players
Heybridge Swifts F.C. players
Witham Town F.C. players
Brightlingsea Regent F.C. players
East Thurrock United F.C. players
Concord Rangers F.C. players
Hemel Hempstead Town F.C. players
Crawley Town F.C. players
Woking F.C. players
Ayr United F.C. players
Isthmian League players
National League (English football) players
English Football League players
Scottish Professional Football League players
Association football wingers
Association football forwards
England semi-pro international footballers